Nguyễn Phi Hoàng (born 27 March 2003) is a Vietnamese footballer who plays as a winger for V.League 1 club SHB Đà Nẵng.

Club career

Promoted to SHB Đà Nẵng's first team in 2020, Phi Hoàng made his professional debut with the club in a 1–0 V.League 1 win to Hải Phòng on 26 September 2020.

With 3 goals and 3 assists in the 2022 season, Phi Hoàng was given the V.League 1 Young Player of the Season award.

Career statistics

Club

Notes

Honours

Individual
 V.League 1 Young Player of the Season: 2022

References

2003 births
Living people
Vietnamese footballers
Association football forwards
V.League 1 players
SHB Da Nang FC players